Karmiel is a city in northern Israel. Established in 1964 as a development town, Karmiel is located in the Beit HaKerem Valley which divides upper and lower Galilee.

History

This area, near the main road between Acre and Safed, had been an important marble quarrying site. In 1961, the Israeli authorities expropriated the land to build Karmiel. The villagers offered "equally good land" in the area, but when Moshe Sneh (Maki) and Yusef Khamis (Mapam) brought the case to the Knesset on behalf of the villagers, the Knesset established that there was no such land. However, the land was rocky, uninhabited and unfit for agriculture.
In 1964, when local Arabs applied for permission to move into the town, Minister of Housing Yosef Almogi replied that "Karmiel was not built to solve the problems for the people in the surrounding area." In February 1965, 400 protesters marched from Tel Aviv to protest against "discrimination of a group of our citizens". Representatives went to a local police station, informing the police that they were staying in the area without permission. Eventually, the perceived leaders were arrested and tried before a military tribunal.

Karmiel was one of the first cities in Israel to be established according to an urban master plan. It was built as part of the Central Galilee Development Project. Work began in 1963, and the official inauguration ceremony took place in October 1964. The first 16 families moved in at that time. A tender for the construction of Karmiel's main roads was issued in 1963, and Mekorot built a water pipe network connecting Karmiel, Rameh, Sha'ab and other nearby villages. In 1972, Karmiel was granted development town status, which bolstered its growth due to government-provided economic incentives to attract young couples.

In 1981, Karmiel was awarded the Beautiful Israel prize and the Kaplan Prize for Management and Services. Karmiel achieved city status on November 20, 1986. The first mayor was Baruch Venger, followed by Adi Eldar, who has remained in this position until Moshe Kuninsky took his place in 2018.

18,000 new immigrants settled in Karmiel between 1990 and 2002. And in the 2000s, some SLA families were resettled in Karmiel following the Israeli withdrawal from South Lebanon.

During the Second Lebanon War in 2006, Hezbollah fired 180 Katyusha rockets into Karmiel and the neighboring villages, leading to casualties and damage to buildings, roads, and cars.

Geography

Karmiel is located on the Acre–Safed road, on the northern edge of the Lower Galilee. The Hilazon Stream passes slightly to the south of Karmiel. Its tributaries, the Shezor and Shagor Streams pass through Karmiel on the east and north, respectively. Karmiel sits on the Shagor mountain range, which stretches from Mount Hazon in the east (next to Maghar) to Mount Gilon in the west (at Gilon). Western Karmiel was built on the Karmi (362 m) and Makosh (315 m) mountains. Work on a new railway line linking Haifa and Karmiel began in 2011 and opened in 2017.

Demographics

, the city encompasses an area of about 24 km2 with a population of about 50,000 residents approximately 40% of whom are immigrants from 75 countries. The city also receives significant internal migration of Haredi families. Since 1990, 16,000 immigrants have arrived in Karmiel, the majority of whom are from the Former Soviet Union. According to the national master plan, by 2020 Karmiel will have a population of approximately 120,000 residents. Since 1980, six new neighborhoods have been developed and populated, and a technical college has been serving the community since 1989. , work is underway to create a further neighborhood on Mount Karmi on Karmiel's western fringe. 
According to The Times of Israel, Israeli Arabs "...now constitute around six percent of Karmiel's population - around 2,760 people..."

The Israel Democracy Institute report of 2018, as quoted in The Times of Israel, suggests Karmiel is one of a number of cities, 'in the process of being mixed', and reflects the upward mobility of some Arab Israelis, who seek to move into predominantly Jewish towns and cities, which do not suffer from a lack of government planning and construction.

Local government

Municipality
The local government is the Municipality of Karmiel, which is responsible for all the municipal matters regarding the City.

Mayors
Adam Tal was the first official head of the group that founded Karmiel in 1964. Avraham Argov replaced him and was himself replaced in 1968 by Baruch Venger, who headed the municipality of Karmiel until his death in office on November 22, 1988. His successor was Adi Eldar, who was re-elected several times. In November 2018, Moshe Kuninsky was elected Mayor of Karmiel.

Education
Today there are four high schools, four junior high schools, a vocational training center, nine state-run elementary schools, one state-run religious school (including high school), an independent education elementary school, a school for gifted children and an educational farm, many kindergartens, nursery schools and daycare centers, as well as a network of community youth and sports centers and the international ORT Braude College of Engineering with a student body of 3,500 studying computers, electronics, industrial administration, biotechnology and other subjects. A biotechnology research and development center will also open at the college. However, despite a gradual increase in the Arab-Israeli population of Karmiel (c. six percent as of 2020), there is no Arabic-speaking school.

In November 2020, Krayot Magistrate's Court ruled against a lawsuit brought by Attorney Nizar Bakri on behalf of his two Arab Israeli nephews, alleging their right to education in their home city of Karmiel had been infringed by the municipality's failure to provide transport to and from Arabic-language schools outside the town. As above, Karmiel presently has no Arabic-language schools. In dismissing the case, Magistrate Court Judge, Yaniv Luzon, ruled that Karmiel is "a Jewish city which is intended to strengthen Jewish settlement in the Galilee. The construction of an Arabic-language school or providing transportation for Arab students, wherever and whoever wants it, could change the demographic balance and character of the city." The Judge's ruling was based upon the controversial 2018 Nation State Law, which states that, "the right to exercise national self-determination in the State of Israel is unique to the Jewish people." To its critics, the law constitutionally enshrines Jewish supremacy and ethno-religious discrimination into Israel's Basic Law and relegates Israel's large Arab minority to inferior status. The case has aroused controversy as it may be read as an example of this state-sanctioned inequality between Jewish and Arab Israelis.

Health care
In 2011, a Terem emergency care clinic was opened in Karmiel. The clinic is under the medical management of Dr. Walid Assadi and is open seven days a week, including Sabbath and holidays. Israel's four national health funds all maintain clinics in the city. In addition, Karmiel has dental clinics, general clinics, and private clinics.

Culture
The city is known for the Karmiel Dance Festival, a yearly event since 1988. The festival is usually held for 3 days and nights in July, and includes dance performances, workshops, and open dance sessions. The festival began as a celebration of Israeli folk dance, but today it features many different dance forms from all around the globe, and attracts thousands of dancers and hundreds of thousands of spectators from many countries.

"Nitzotz-Machanayim" is a community center which caters to the Russian-speaking population of Karmiel. It is one of a number of similar centers in Israel which operate in the framework of the Machanayim "Communities" project. Rabbi Eli Talberg is the director of Natzotz-Machanyim, which is located on the first floor of "Kikar Ha’Ir" (often called "The Old Mall"). Activities include a Beit-Midrash, conversion classes, Hebrew classes, a youth club, a women's club, and additional workshops and activities for all ages. The community also organizes regular educational tours throughout Israel and participates in sporting and social events with other branches of the Communities project.

Environmental protection
Karmiel was the first Israeli city to receive ISO 9002 certification for the quality of its services. It is one of the few Israeli cities with ISO 1410 certification for environmental standards. Karmiel has enacted by-laws to protect the environment and prevent pollution, and become a center for clean industries and advanced technology enterprises that abide by these standards.

Parks and gardens

The Holocaust Memorial Park is located at the entrance to the city. The bronze sculptures were made by Jewish sculptor and artist Nicky Imber (1920-1996). The sculptures are separated into three groups: Holocaust, wondering and hope; which represent the story of the Jewish people from the time of the Holocaust to the return to the holy land.

The Karmiel Quarries Park is a 12.4-acre park developed on the site of a defunct limestone quarry. One section of the park is a sculpture garden. An amphitheater on the grounds of the park hosts local events and incorporates a drainage system that collects rainfall which is later used for watering greenery.

Twin towns – sister cities

 Berat, Albania
 Câmpulung Moldovenesc, Romania
 Charlottenburg-Wilmersdorf (Berlin), Germany
 Denver, United States
 Hamar, Norway
 Kisvárda, Hungary
 Mangalia, Romania
 Metz, France
 Pittsburgh, United States

Notable people
 Aviv Alush (born 1982), actor
 Almog Buzaglo (born 1992), footballer
 Erel Margalit (born 1961), politician and a high-tech and social entrepreneur
 Moran Samuel (born 1982), paralympic basketball player and world champion rower
 Ezequiel Skverer (born 1989), basketball player

See also
Emtan Karmiel

References

Bibliography

External links

 
 Karmiel Public Library
 Local Portal
 Karmiel Photo album

Development towns
1964 establishments in Israel
Cities in Northern District (Israel)
Populated places established in 1964